"Ballerina" is a popular song, sometimes known as "Dance, Ballerina, Dance". The song was written by Carl Sigman with lyrics by Sidney Keith 'Bob' Russell.  Published in 1947, the tune is listed as ASCAP Title Code 320012517.

Notable recordings
Hit versions were recorded by:
 Vaughn Monroe (#1 in 1947)
 Buddy Clark (#5 in 1948)
 Bing Crosby (recorded December 3, 1947  - #10 in 1948)
 Jimmy Dorsey (also #10 in 1948)
 Nat King Cole (#18 in 1957)

Other notable recordings
1961 Jack Jones Shall We Dance? 
1961 Nat King Cole - a stereophonic version included in the album The Nat King Cole Story 
1962 Sammy Davis Jr. - In the style of Huckleberry Hound, Kingfish from Amos 'n' Andy and Nat King Cole for the album The Sammy Davis Jr. All-Star Spectacular 
1965 Sammy Davis Jr. - The Nat King Cole Songbook 
2017 Gregory Porter - in the album Nat "King" Cole & Me

References

Sources 
Second Hand Songs

1947 songs
Nat King Cole songs
Bing Crosby songs
Vaughn Monroe songs
1948 singles
1957 singles
Songs written by Carl Sigman
Songs with lyrics by Bob Russell (songwriter)
Songs about dancing
Songs about theatre